Sibara is a genus of ten plant species in the family Brassicaceae known commonly as the winged rockcresses. They are native to North America. Sibara are similar to cardamines, sending up thin herbaceous stems that bear tiny white to purple flowers. Seeds are borne in flat, laterally compressed, fleshy fruits up to an inch long.
Selected species:
Sibara deserti - desert winged rockcress
Sibara filifolia - Santa Cruz Island winged rockcress
Sibara grisea - Marble Canyon winged rockcress
Sibara rosulata - California winged rockcress
Sibara viereckii - Viereck's winged rockcress
Sibara virginica - Virginia winged rockcress

References

External links
USDA Plants Profile
Jepson Manual Treatment

Brassicaceae
Brassicaceae genera